This is a list of New Delhi State Protected Monuments as officially reported by and available through the website of the government of NCT Delhi. The monument identifier is a combination of the abbreviation of the subdivision of the list (state, ASI circle) and the numbering as published on the website of the ASI. 33 State Protected Monuments have been recognized by the Delhi government till date - the number is expected to rise until 92. Besides the State Protected Monuments, also the Monuments of National Importance in this state might be relevant. 

See also:
 List of State Protected Monuments in India for other State Protected Monuments in India
 List of Monuments of National Importance in Delhi

|}

References 

Delhi
 
State Protected Monuments
Lists of tourist attractions in Delhi